{{DISPLAYTITLE:Gamma1 Octantis}}

Gamma1 Octantis, Latinized from γ1 Octantis, is a single, yellow-hued star in the constellation which includes the southern celestial pole, Octans. Its apparent visual magnitude is 5.10, meaning that in good conditions it is bright enough to be faintly visible to the naked eye.

Distance and proper motion
Based upon an annual parallax shift of 12.30 mas which is taken during opposing points of the Earth's orbit of the sun (with compensation for its eccentricity), the star is about 265 light years away. Its (proper) motion has a net vector at present of receding from the Sun, at +15.4 km/s.

Characteristics
This is an evolved G-type giant star with a stellar classification of G7 III. It is a red clump star, which means it is generating energy through helium fusion at its core. The star has an estimated 1.81 times the mass of the Sun and it has expanded to 11 times the Sun's radius. It is radiating 69 times the Sun's luminosity from its enlarged photosphere at an effective temperature of 5,150 K.

Gap between stars sharing Gamma designation
The very similar brightness and potentially close stars of Gamma2, 3 have been examined by the Gaia space telescope/observatory. Gamma2 is much more distant than the other two whose margins of error overlap when parallaxes are considered — they may thus be close enough to be in loose mutual orbital.  These distances from our star system per Gaia's second Data Release (DR2) are, respectively, around 319 ± 5 ly and 259 ± 3 ly. The observation refines Gamma1 as being 262 ± 4 ly away.

References

G-type giants
Horizontal-branch stars
Octans
Octantis, Gamma1
Durchmusterung objects
223647
117689
9032